Nedeljko Stojisic (born 25 September 1997) is a Serbian footballer who currently plays as a goalkeeper. He currently play for Machida Zelvia.

Career
On 9 January 2023, Stojisic announcement officially transfer to J2 club, Machida Zelvia for upcoming 2023 season.

Career statistics

Club

Notes

References

External links

1997 births
Living people
Serbian footballers
Serbian expatriate footballers
Association football goalkeepers
J1 League players
J2 League players
FK Voždovac players
FK BASK players
Portimonense S.C. players
Vegalta Sendai players
FC Machida Zelvia players
Serbian expatriate sportspeople in Portugal
Expatriate footballers in Portugal
Serbian expatriate sportspeople in Japan
Expatriate footballers in Japan